Francisco Verdugo Cabrera (25 July 1561 – 20 July 1636) was a Spanish Catholic prelate who served as Bishop of Ayacucho o Huamanga (1622–1636). As word of his death had not yet reached Europe, he was appointed Archbishop of Mexico posthumously.

Biography
Francisco Verdugo Cabrera was born in Carmona, Spain on 25 July 1561. On 14 March 1622, he was appointed during the papacy of Pope Gregory XV as Bishop of Ayacucho o Huamanga. On 27 December 1622, he was consecrated bishop by Luis Jerónimo Oré, Bishop of Concepción. On 20 July 1636, he died as Bishop of Ayacucho o Huamanga. As news of his death had not reached Europe, he was appointed on 9 September 1636 during the papacy of Pope Urban VIII as Archbishop of Mexico.

See also
Catholic Church in Peru

References

External links and additional sources
 (for Chronology of Bishops)
 (for Chronology of Bishops)
 (for Chronology of Bishops)
 (for Chronology of Bishops)

Spanish Roman Catholic bishops in South America
17th-century Roman Catholic bishops in Peru
Bishops appointed by Pope Gregory XV
Bishops appointed by Pope Urban VIII
1561 births
1636 deaths
Roman Catholic bishops of Ayacucho